, or Han Yang in Chinese, is a Japanese table tennis player of Chinese origin. He won two gold medals in the men's singles at the 2007 ITTF Pro Tour series in Belo Horizonte, Brazil, and in Santiago, Chile. As of December 2012, Kan is ranked no. 99 in the world by the International Table Tennis Federation (ITTF). Kan is a member of the table tennis team for Tokyo Art Club in Tokyo, Japan, and is coached and trained by Ryo Yuzawa. Kan is also right-handed, and uses offensive, penhold grip.

Representing his adopted nation Japan, Kan qualified for the men's singles at the 2008 Summer Olympics in Beijing, by earning an entry score of 12,000.75 points, and being selected as one of the top 15 seeded players from ITTF's Computer Team Ranking List. He received three byes in the preliminary rounds, before defeating Russia's Alexei Smirnov in the fourth match. Kan progressed to the round of sixteen match, where he lost to Chinese table tennis player and Olympic silver medalist Wang Hao, with a set-score of 1–4.

Kan also joined with his fellow players Seiya Kishikawa and Jun Mizutani for the inaugural men's team event. He and his team progressed to the knock-out stage by winning the preliminary pool round against Hong Kong, Nigeria, and Russia, with a total of six points and three straight victories. They lost the semi-final match to the German team (led by Dimitrij Ovtcharov), with a sudden death set score of 2–3, but offered another shot for the bronze medal by entering the play-offs. Kan and his team, however, were defeated in the second play-off by the Austrian trio Chen Weixing, Robert Gardos, and former world champion Werner Schlager, with a set score of 1–3.

References

External links
 
 
 
 
 

1978 births
Living people
Japanese male table tennis players
Table tennis players at the 2008 Summer Olympics
Olympic table tennis players of Japan
Chinese emigrants to Japan
Table tennis players from Shenyang
Sportspeople from Tokyo
Table tennis players at the 2006 Asian Games
Chinese male table tennis players
Naturalised table tennis players
Asian Games competitors for Japan